John Goodricke (1764–1786) was an English astronomer.

John Goodricke may also refer to:

Sir John Goodricke, 1st Baronet (1617–1670), MP for Yorkshire
Sir John Goodricke, 5th Baronet (1708–1789), British diplomat and politician
Sir John Goodricke, 3rd Baronet (1654–1705), of the Goodricke baronets
Sir John Goodricke, 5th Baronet (1708–1789), of the Goodricke baronets